The Ottoman–Persian Wars or Ottoman–Iranian Wars were a series of wars between Ottoman Empire and the Safavid, Afsharid, Zand, and Qajar dynasties of Iran (Persia) through the 16th–19th centuries. The Ottomans consolidated their control of what is today Turkey in the 15th century, and gradually came into conflict with the emerging neighboring Iranian state, led by Ismail I of the Safavid dynasty. The two states were arch rivals, and were also divided by religious grounds, the Ottomans being staunchly Sunni and the Safavids being Shia. A series of military conflicts ensued for centuries during which the two empires competed for control over eastern Anatolia, the Caucasus, and Iraq.

Among the numerous treaties, the Treaty of Zuhab of 1639 is usually considered as the most significant, as it fixed present Turkey–Iran and Iraq–Iran borders. In later treaties, there were frequent references to the Treaty of Zuhab.

See also
Ottoman–Safavid relations
Habsburg–Persian alliance
Franco-Ottoman alliance
Ottoman–Hotaki War (1726–1727)
Persian campaign (World War I)
Russo-Persian Wars
Russo-Turkish Wars

References

Sources
 Yves Bomati and Houchang Nahavandi,Shah Abbas, Emperor of Persia, 1587–1629, 2017, ed. Ketab Corporation, Los Angeles, English translation by Azizeh Azodi.
 

 
Iran–Turkey relations
Geopolitical rivalry
Ottoman period in Armenia
Early Modern history of Georgia (country)
Military operations involving the Crimean Khanate
Early Modern history of Iraq
History of Anatolia
History of the Caucasus
History of Western Asia
History of Europe